Bernard Benyamin Van Aert (born ) is an Indonesian road and track cyclist. He won the silver medal in the omnium at the 2022 UCI Track Cycling Nations Cup.

Major results
2019
 5th Road race, National Road Championships
2020
 Asian Track Championships
3rd  Points race
3rd  Scratch
2022
 UCI Track Cycling Nations Cup
2nd  Omnium, Cali
 5th Road race, Southeast Asian Games

References

External links

1997 births
Living people
Indonesian male cyclists
People from Singkawang
Cyclists at the 2018 Asian Games
Competitors at the 2021 Southeast Asian Games